Furtwangler Glacier is located near the summit of Mount Kilimanjaro in Tanzania. The glacier is named after  who, with Siegfried König, formed the fourth party to ascend to the summit of Kilimanjaro in 1912.

The glacier is a small remnant of an ice cap that once crowned the summit of Kilimanjaro. Almost 85 percent of the ice cover disappeared from October 1912 to June 2011. In 2013 it was estimated that at the then-current rate, most of the ice would disappear by 2040 and "it is highly unlikely that any ice body will remain after 2060".

Furtwängler Glacier is ephemeral, existing continuously only since about 1650 CE, which corresponds with very high levels in Kenya's Lake Naivasha and the beginning of the Maunder Minimum.

During fieldwork conducted early in 2006, scientists discovered a large hole near the center of the glacier. This hole, extending through the  remaining thickness of the glacier to the underlying rock, split the glacier in two by 2007.

See also
Retreat of glaciers since 1850
List of glaciers

References

Glaciers of Tanzania
Pangani basin